Badminton at the 2014 Summer Youth Olympics took place from 17 to 22 August 2014. The competition was held at the Nanjing Sport Institute in Nanjing, China.

Qualification

56 places, 28 per each gender were decided by the junior world rankings released on 2 May 2014. Each National Olympic Committee (NOC) could enter a maximum of 2 competitors per gender should they both rank in the top 4 in the junior world rankings. Each of the five continents must be represented in each gender thus the highest ranked player from each continent automatically qualifies. China will also automatically qualify due to it being the host nation, however this did not happen as China already qualified two athletes in each gender due to rankings. Finally, the quarterfinalists from the 2014 World Junior Championships qualified provided they did not surpass the maximum quota for each NOC. A further 8 spots, 4 in each gender were also allocated by the Tripartite Commission.

To be eligible to participate at the 2014 Youth Olympics, athletes must have been born between 1 January 1996 and 31 December 1999.

Boys

Girls

Schedule

The schedule was released by the Nanjing Youth Olympic Games Organizing Committee.

All times are CST (UTC+8)

Medal summary

Medal table

Events

References

External links
Official Results Book – Badminton

 
2014 Summer Youth Olympics events
Youth Summer Olympics
Badminton tournaments in China
2014